Tanec snov is a Slovak reality television series that premiered on March 8, 2015, on the television channel JOJ. The concept of the series presents nine local celebrities coupled with an equal number of dancers to "dance their dream" in common. Viliam Rozboril and Barbora Rakovská have been hosting the show since, while Eva Máziková, Ján Ďurovčík and Peter Modrovský, these were promoted as the judges for the series opening season. Apart from that, a guest judge will appear per episode too.

Presenters

Key
 Presenter of Tanec snov

Judging panel

Key
 Judging panel
 Guest judge(s)

Series overview

Reception

Critical response
The reality television received negative reviews from ČSFD.cz, a local review aggregator website devoted to film and news that includes TV content as well. As of April 8, 2015, the site's consensus reports 13 out of 100% based on 92 online reviews, with most of them criticizing the format as whole.

TV ratings
The broadcast of the show scored an average 22.5% ratings share among persons aged 12–54, attracting roughly 245,000 viewers in the demographic per episode. Ratings somewhat increased as the real-time event progressed after its pilot episode. The second and sixth sequel saw an increase of 2.3 and 1.6%, receiving an overall viewership of 262,000 and 241,000 respectively. Nevertheless, the title wouldn't make it to the top, stalling at No. 2 each night since.

In the general 12+ target group, the program provided a series of high ratings in a row, becoming the most watched prime time telecast in the region. On four out of six occasions to date, it was watched by more than half a million audiences, reaching the peak with 572,000 viewers for the fourth. The numbers dropped to the series-lowest 24.3% ratings share, or rather its least 488,000 viewers, upon its fifth instalment that felt on Easter Sunday. The following week, the show restored lost figures, achieving its highest share ever which exceeded 30%.

References

External links
 
 Tanec snov (at Reality-show.Panacek.com)

2015 Slovak television series debuts
Slovak reality television series
TV JOJ original programming